Holley is a census-designated place and unincorporated community in Linn County, Oregon, United States. As of the 2010 census it had a population of 378.

The Holley area was once the source of the semi-precious gemstone Holley blue agate.

Demographics

References

Unincorporated communities in Linn County, Oregon
Census-designated places in Oregon
Census-designated places in Linn County, Oregon
Unincorporated communities in Oregon